Julie Fennell is an American author and sociologist at Gallaudet University.

She has written a sociology book about the BDSM community from an insider's perspective, analyzing group norms and demographics. She writes about sexual consent and observes that there is difficulty translating norms within the kink subculture to the outside world in a consensual way.

She has also published on unintended pregnancy and contraceptive use. Work by Fennell was included in Best Womens Erotica of the Year in 2022 by Simon & Schuster.

Fennell has a doctorate degree from Brown University.

References

Living people
BDSM writers
Gallaudet University faculty
Brown University alumni
American sociologists
21st-century American women writers
Year of birth missing (living people)